Lt. Col. Władysław Toruń (July 7, 1889 in Nowy Sącz - August 9, 1924) was a Polish aviator and military pilot, one of the pioneers of the Polish aviation. Initially a military pilot in Austria-Hungary during the Great War, he was among the first pilots to join the Polish Air Force. He took part in the Battle of Lwów (1918) and the Battle of Lwów (1920). As a professional engineer, in 1922-1923 he was chief of Central Aircraft Workshops (Centralne Warsztaty Lotnicze - CWL) in Warsaw. He died in an air crash in 1924.

1889 births
1924 deaths
People from Nowy Sącz
Polish aviators
Polish Austro-Hungarians
Austro-Hungarian World War I pilots
Polish people of the Polish–Ukrainian War
Polish people of the Polish–Soviet War
Aviators killed in aviation accidents or incidents
Recipients of the Silver Cross of the Virtuti Militari
Recipients of the Cross of Valour (Poland)
Victims of aviation accidents or incidents in 1924